Scott Phillips (born 1961) is an American writer primarily of crime fiction in the noir tradition. He was born in Wichita, Kansas, and after co-writing and directing the independent short film Walking Blues lived for several years in France, working as a translator and photographer. He returned to the United States living in California as a screenwriter, co-writing a 1996 thriller called Crosscut among many other projects, both credited and uncredited. He has sometimes been confused with another author of the same professional name.

His first novel, The Ice Harvest, was published in 2000, and won the California Book Award, as well as being nominated for the Edgar Award and Hammett Prize, and shortlisted for the Crime Writers' Association Gold Dagger Award.  A black comic noir thriller set in the low-rent world of sleazy Wichita strip clubs on Christmas Eve 1979, The Ice Harvest was adapted into a film of the same title in 2005.

He followed this in 2002 with The Walkaway, a combined prequel/sequel and spin-off to The Ice Harvest set in Wichita during the 1940s and 1980s. His third novel, Cottonwood, set in Kansas and California during the Western era, was published in 2004.

Rut, a study of quirky characters in a post-apocalyptic Colorado followed six years later, but in the meantime Phillips had published several well-received short stories, later collected with some previously unpublished works in Rum, Sodomy, and False Eyelashes. Many characters in these stories either turn up at other points in their lives in Phillips' novels, or are related to characters in those volumes, thereby making much of Phillips' output to date an evolving tapestry of cross-generational familial connections.

Phillips returned to his ever-decadent Wichita as a setting for his next novel The Adjustment, exploring the snowballing petty corruption of a returning World War II veteran. Rake followed, originally published in the French language and telling the story of a minor television star from the United States who finds greater fame in Paris and pulls himself into a darkly comic tangle as he pursues women and a movie deal. Hop Alley, a companion to Cottonwood was next. The publication of St. Louis Noir of which he is the editor and a contributor followed in 2016.

Most recently, That Left Turn At Albuquerque, was released in 2020.

Phillips lives in St. Louis, Missouri, with his wife and daughter.

Books
 The Ice Harvest (2000)
 The Walkaway (2002)
 Cottonwood (2004)
 Rut (2010)
 Rum, Sodomy, and False Eyelashes Short Story Collection (2011)
 The Adjustment (2012)
 Rake (2013)
 Hop Alley (2014)
 St. Louis Noir Editor/Contributor (2016)
 That Left Turn At Albuquerque (2020)

References

External links
 Scott Phillips's official web site
 Scott Phillips Discusses Crime Noir
 Scott Phillips' Facebook Profile

1961 births
Living people
21st-century American novelists
American crime fiction writers
American male novelists
Writers from Wichita, Kansas
Writers from St. Louis
21st-century American male writers
Novelists from Missouri